Helton is a village in the Eden district, in the English county of Cumbria. It is about a mile south of the village of Askham. Circa 1870, it had a population of 180 as recorded in the Imperial Gazetteer of England and Wales. The village is situated on a steep slope running down from the limestone fells to the flood plain of the River Lowther. Helton is on Wideworth Farm Road, which forms part of the road north to Penrith, and south towards Bampton. A Wesleyan chapel was built in Helton in c.1857 and is a Grade II listed building, now converted for residential use .

Location grid

Notable Former Residents

Mark Eden (Chief Engineer, Ford).

See also

Listed buildings in Askham, Cumbria

References

External links
 Cumbria County History Trust: Askham (nb: provisional research only – see Talk page)

Villages in Cumbria
Askham, Cumbria